The Dasht River is located in the Makran region and Gwadar District, in the southwestern section of Balochistan Province, Pakistan which drains near Jiwani.

Tributaries
The Kech River which (maxime) flows through Kech valley is the eastern tributary of the Dasht River and the Nihing River is the western tributary and flows east from the Iran–Pakistan border before emptying at Mirani Dam where both the rivers join to form the Dasht River.

Mirani Dam
The Mirani Dam is located across the Dasht River in the Central Makran Range. The dam was built to supply agricultural irrigation water for the surrounding areas, flood control in the downstream region, and to provide drinking water for the city of Gwadar.

References

External links

Rivers of Balochistan (Pakistan)
Gwadar District
Rivers of Pakistan